Chinese Food in Minutes is a UK-based series, based upon Ching He Huang's cookbook of the same name, published by HarperCollins in September 2009.

In each episode, she prepares two versions of authentic Chinese dishes and takeaway classics. Watching her are two participants who have never attempted to cook Chinese cuisine before.

The chef then makes a third course designed to complement the meal. She also gives viewers at home her own tips, tackling a different aspect of Chinese cookery each week.

Broadcasts
Chinese Food in Minutes is a 13-part peak time cooking television series commissioned and shown by Five, first aired on 9 February 2010. The first part of Chinese Food in Minutes, with chef Ching-He Huang, served up 1 million viewers and 4% share that night. The series Chinese Food in Minutes was based on Huang's title of the same name, published by HarperCollins in September 2009.

Publications
A recipe book accompanies the TV series.
Ching's Chinese Food in Minutes (HarperCollins, 2009)

References
 Chinese Food In Minutes - Five -  by Jane Simon
 Five gets saucy with Huang
 TV ratings – 9 February
 Krempelwood TV and online production/Chinese Food in Minutes with Sharwood’s

External links
 
 Official Five website
 Ching-He Huang's Official Website

Channel 5 (British TV channel) original programming
2010 British television series debuts
2010 British television series endings
British cooking television shows
2010s British cooking television series
Chinese cookbooks
English-language television shows